Hamed Mahmoudi is a professional footballer who plays as a defender. He started his career with Esteghlal Khuzestan in Azadegan League.

Esteghlal Khuzestan
Hamed played his very first game against his future team Shahrdari Yasuj in Azadegan League. Hamed promoted with his team to Persian Gulf Pro League, but soon after he went to a loan deal with Shahrdari Yasuj.

Naft Masjed Soleyman
Hamed was on the 2014 transfer deal for Naft Masjed Soleyman. His first match was against Peykan with a 0-0 draw. He also got the first 3 points for the club in the league against the defending champions Foolad.

Honours
Esteghlal Khuzestan
Azadegan League (1): 2012-13 (Runners Up)

References

1987 births
Living people
Iranian footballers
Naft Masjed Soleyman F.C. players
Zagros Yasuj F.C. players
Esteghlal Khuzestan players
Association football defenders
People from Babol
Sportspeople from Mazandaran province